The 2005 Valencia Superbike World Championship round was the third round of the 2005 Superbike World Championship. It took place on the weekend of April 22–24, 2005 at the Circuit Ricardo Tormo in Valencia, Spain.

Results

Superbike race 1 classification

Superbike race 2 classification

Supersport race classification

References
 Superbike Race 1
 Superbike Race 2
 Supersport Race

Superbike World Championship round
Superbike World Championship round
Valencia